Don Manuel Allendesalazar y Muñoz de Salazar (24 August 1856 – 17 May 1923) was a Spanish noble and politician who served two terms as Prime Minister of Spain during the reign of King Alfonso XIII. 

Allendesalazar was born in Guernica. He occupied other political offices such as Minister of State and Mayor of Madrid. He died in Madrid on May 17, 1923.

References

External links
 

|-

1856 births
1923 deaths
People from Guernica
Conservative Party (Spain) politicians
Prime Ministers of Spain
Economy and finance ministers of Spain
Foreign ministers of Spain
Mayors of Madrid
Governors of the Bank of Spain
Interior ministers of Spain
Presidents of the Senate of Spain
Honorary Knights Grand Cross of the Royal Victorian Order